Tom Craig is a British documentary photographer.<ref>[http://www.f2freelancephotographer.com/profiles/prolfiles_f2_tomcraig.pdf TOM CRAIG"] F2 FREELANCE+DIGITAL. Retrieved 15 July 2013.</ref>

Background
Craig's work has been featured in publications including Vogue, Vanity Fair, Esquire, and The Sunday Times magazine, in campaigns for Louis Vuitton, Alice Temperley, Mr. Porter, Persol, and in his unique collaboration with A.A. Gill, which has spanned 25 locations across the globe. He also has a regular column in Sunday Times Style entitled 'Snap Shot', which runs weekly."It was like like an otherworldly take on Fritz Lang's Metropolis and Rooney Mara in The Girl with the Dragon Tattoo" Sunday Times. Retrieved 16 July 2013.

In 2010, Craig's on-going work with the Nobel Peace Prize-winning organisation Medecins Sans Frontieres culminated in the book Writing on the Edge, which featured his photography paired with essays told from war-torn regions. Highlights include Martin Amis experiencing firsthand the problems of gang violence in Colombia; New York Times best-selling author Tracy Chevalier recounting the abuse of women in Burundi; Oscar-winning actor Daniel Day-Lewis reporting from Palestine; and Danny Boyle searching for the "lost sea" of Uzbekistan.

Craig has either won or been nominated three times for 'British Magazine Photographer of the Year', exhibited for five consecutive years at the National Portrait Gallery, served as Photographer-in-Residence for the Royal Geographical Society, was named The Telegraph "Travel Photographer of the Year", participated in the prestigious World Press Master Class (which selects 12 photographers from more than 60 countries), and was awarded the Royal Photographic Society's prize for a notable achievement in the art of photography by someone under 35.

In March 2012, Craig's show 'The Bigger Picture' opened on Cork Street in London featuring twenty images from fourteen countries that were also written about at the same moment by A.A. Gill."Photographer Tom Craig's best shot" The Guardian. Retrieved 12 July 2013."The Bigger Picture" Vogue. Retrieved 14 July 2013.

In 2013, Craig took part in a joint exhibition with Bay Garnett at the Vogue Festival in London. He also participated on a discussion panel for Vogue on ecological fashion.

Craig lives in London with his partner, stylist Bay Garnett, and their two children.

Career
 The Royal Geographical Society (1998–2000)
 The Independent (2000–2004) 
 Regularly contributed to British/American/Japanese and Russian Vogue (2008–2013)
 Regular contributor to The Sunday Times magazine (2011–present)

Awards
 2001 British Magazine Photographer of the Year
 2001 Arts and Entertainment Photographer of the Year
 2004 The Telegraph Travel Photographer of the Year
 2004 World Press Photo's Joop Swart Master Class
 2005 Vic Odden award "Outstanding Contribution to the Art of Photography," The Royal Photographic Society

Exhibitions

Solo
 2011 Writing on the Edge Royal Society of Medicine, London.
 2012 The Bigger Picture  Tom Craig and writing by A.A Gill, South Kensington, London.
 2012 The Bigger Picture  Tom Craig and writing by A.A Gill, Cork Street, London.

Group
 2003 Nobody's priority: The young of Africa Visa Pour L'image Perpignan Festival of Photography.
 2008 Childscapes Proud Central, London. 
 2011 Tom Craig and Chaylza Price, Multimedia Art Museum, Baku, Azerbaijan.
 2013 All Four Corners Tom Craig and Bay Garnett, Vogue'' Festival, London.

Publications

References

External links
 Tom Craig Official site

1974 births
Photographers from Cornwall
Living people
Documentary photographers